Khadoor Sahib Lok Sabha constituency is one of the 13 Lok Sabha (parliamentary) constituencies of Punjab state in northern India. This new constituency came into existence as a part of the implementation of delimitation of parliamentary and assembly constituencies in 2008.

Assembly segments
This constituency comprises nine Vidhan Sabha (legislative assembly) segments. These are: Before delimitation, Kapurthala and Sultanpur Lodhi assembly segments were in Jalandhar, Zira assembly segment was in Firozpur and Jandiala, Patti, Khadoor Sahib and Tarn Taran assembly segments were in Tarn Taran Lok Sabha constituencies. Khem Karan assembly segment was created as a part of delimitation in 2008.

Members of Parliament

Election results

2019

2014

2009

See also
 Tarn Taran Lok Sabha constituency
 Sangrur Lok Sabha constituency
 List of Constituencies of the Lok Sabha

Notes

External links
Khadoor Sahib lok sabha constituency election 2019 result details

Lok Sabha constituencies in Punjab, India
Amritsar district
Kapurthala district